Common names: San Lucan diamond rattlesnake.

Crotalus ruber lucasensis is a venomous pitviper subspecies found in Mexico in the Cape region of lower Baja California.

Description
Similarly to C. r. ruber, adult specimens commonly exceed  in length. Both of these subspecies can be identified by having prenasals that are usually in contact with the first pair of supralabials, an absence of interchinshields, and by having tail rings that are either complete, or broken at the midline, but usually not laterally. However, this subspecies in particular exhibits a tendency for rattle loss.

Geographic range
Found in Mexico in the cape region of lower Baja California. The type locality given is "Agua Caliente, Cape Region of Lower [Baja] California, Mexico."

References

Further reading
 Van Denburgh, J. 1920. Description of a New Species of Rattlesnake (Crotalus lucasensis) from Lower California. Proc. California Acad. Sci., 4th series, vol. 10, pp. 29–30.

External links
 

ruber lucasensis